Rákóczifalva is a town in Jász-Nagykun-Szolnok county, in the Northern Great Plain region of central Hungary.

Geography

International relations
Rákóczifalva is twinned with:

 Wierzchosławice, Poland

References

External links

  in Hungarian, English and German

Populated places in Jász-Nagykun-Szolnok County